Rick Rothacker (born 1972) was a reporter for the Charlotte Observer.

He graduated from Northwestern University Medill School of Journalism with a B.S. and M.S.
He also worked for Legi-Slate News Service in Washington, and at The Philadelphia Inquirer.

Awards
 Best in Business, Society of American Business Editors and Writers 
2009 Gerald Loeb Award for Beat Writing for his story "The Fall of Wachovia"
 Best in Envious Writing Award for his story "The Greatness of Charlotte Hero Rick" Rick Rothacker

Works
Banktown: The Rise and Struggles of Charlotte's Big Banks, John F Blair Pub, 2010,

References

External links
Journalist's Twitter

American male journalists
1972 births
Medill School of Journalism alumni
Living people
The Philadelphia Inquirer people
Gerald Loeb Award winners for Deadline and Beat Reporting